The 2007 UNCAF Nations Cup was the ninth version of the biennial football tournament for the CONCACAF national teams of Central America. The event took place in San Salvador, El Salvador from February 8 to February 18, 2007. It was the second time El Salvador hosted the competition. The tournament also served as a qualifying process for the 2007 CONCACAF Gold Cup.

Costa Rica won the tournament on penalty kicks after a 1–1 draw with Panama in the final. It was Costa Rica's sixth title out of nine tournaments played. Panama reached the UNCAF final for the first time but also lost on penalty kicks in the final of the CONCACAF Gold Cup 2005.

Participating nations
For El Salvador 2007, UNCAF considered for the first time since the tournament's founding in 1991 to invite national teams from outside of Central America to participate. The organization was in negotiations with Mexico and Venezuela to participate. In the end, this did not happen, and the tournament (officially listed as the UNCAF Copa de Naciones Digicel) proceeded with only the seven UNCAF members.

Participating teams include the seven UNCAF members:

Squads

Stadium

First round

Group 1

±

Group 2

Fifth place

Honduras qualifies for the 2007 CONCACAF Gold Cup

Semifinals

All semifinalists qualify for the 2007 CONCACAF Gold Cup

Third place

Final

Awards

Scorers

4 goals
 Wilmer Velásquez

3 goals
 Eliseo Quintanilla
 Emilio Palacios
 Saúl Martínez
 Rolando Fonseca

2 goals
 Deon McCauley
 Samuel Wilson

1 goal
 Leonardo González
 Harold Wallace
 Kurt Bernard
 Juan Díaz Rodríguez
 Claudio Albizuris
 Gustavo Cabrera
 Milton Busto
 Emil Martínez
 Carlos Will Mejía
 Alberto Blanco
 Luis Tejada
 Ricardo Phillips
 Felipe Baloy
 Carlos Rivera

1 goal (Own Goal)
 Ubaldo Guardia

Notes

 
2007 in Central American football

2007
2007
2006–07 in Salvadoran football
2006–07 in Costa Rican football
2006–07 in Honduran football
2006–07 in Guatemalan football
2006–07 in Nicaraguan football
2006–07 in Panamanian football
2006–07 in Belizean football